Tecnologia is a rugby team based in Lisbon, Portugal. As of the 2012/13 season, they play in the Second Division of the Campeonato Nacional de Rugby (National Championship). The team is the official rugby team of the Faculdade de Ciências e Tecnologia da Universidade Nova de Lisboa at the Universidade Nova de Lisboa.

Portuguese rugby union teams